AEM (alpha-ethylmescaline or 3,4,5-trimethoxy-alpha-ethylphenethylamine) is a lesser-known psychedelic drug.  It is an analog of mescaline. AEM was first synthesized by Alexander Shulgin. In his book PiHKAL, the minimum dosage is listed as 220 mg, and the duration unknown. AEM produces few to no effects. Very little data exists about the pharmacological properties, metabolism, and toxicity of AEM.

See also 
 Phenethylamine
 Psychedelics, dissociatives and deliriants

References

Psychedelic phenethylamines